Fernanda Pereyra (born 30 June 1991) is an Argentine beach volleyball player. She competed in the 2020 Summer Olympics.

Career 
She competed at the 2019 Pan American Games, winning a silver medal. She competed at the 2021 FIVB Beach Volleyball World Tour.

Family 
Her brother is Federico Pereyra.

References

External links
 
 
 
 
 

1991 births
Living people
People from San Juan, Argentina
Sportspeople from Mar del Plata
Beach volleyball players at the 2020 Summer Olympics
Argentine beach volleyball players
Olympic beach volleyball players of Argentina
Pan American Games medalists in volleyball
Medalists at the 2019 Pan American Games
Sportspeople from San Juan Province, Argentina
Pan American Games silver medalists for Argentina